George Ayliffe Poole (1809–1883) was an English Anglican cleric and a writer on religion, church architecture and history. He strongly advocated the Gothic Revival.

Life
Poole was a scholar of Emmanuel College, Cambridge, who graduated B.A. in 1831 and proceeded M.A. in 1838. He took holy orders in 1832, and was curate successively of Twickenham, of the Church of St John the Evangelist, Edinburgh, and of St Chad's Church, Shrewsbury. On 16 March 1839 he was appointed perpetual curate of St James's, Leeds.

In 1843 Poole was presented to the vicarage of Welford, Northamptonshire. which he held until, in 1876, he was presented by William Connor Magee, Bishop of Peterborough, to the rectory of Winwick in the same county. He acted for some years as rural dean of the district.

Poole was a strong high churchman. He died at Winwick on 25 September 1883, having married a daughter of Jonathan Wilks of St Ann's, Burley.

Works
Poole, with John Henry Parker and Matthew Holbeche Bloxam, was a leading advocate of the Gothic Revival. His works, with sermons and tracts, were these: 

The Exile's Return; or a Cat's Journey from Glasgow to Edinburgh, a tale for children, Edinburgh, 1837
The Testimony of St. Cyprian against Rome, London, 1838
The Anglo-Catholic Use of Two Lights upon the Altar, for the signification that Christ is the very true Light of the World, stated and defended, London, 1840
The Life and Times of St. Cyprian, Oxford, 1840
On the present State of Parties in the Church of England, with especial reference to the alleged tendencies of the Oxford School to the Doctrines and Communion of Rome, London, 1841
The Appropriate Character of Church Architecture, Leeds, 1842; reissued in 1845 as ‘Churches: their Structure, Arrangement, and Decoration,’ London
Churches of Yorkshire, described and edited (with others), 1842
A History of the Church in America (part of vol. ii. of The Christian's Miscellany), Leeds, 1842
A History of England, from the First Invasion by the Romans to the Accession of Queen Victoria, London, 1844–1845, 2 vols
The Churches of Scarborough, Filey, and the Neighbourhood, London, 1848 (with John West Hugall)
A History of Ecclesiastical Architecture in England, London, 1848
Sir Raoul de Broc and his Son Tristram, a tale of the twelfth century, London, 1849
An historical and descriptive Guide to York Cathedral (with Hugall), York, 1850
Architectural, historical, and picturesque Illustrations of the Chapel of St. Augustine, Skirlaugh, Yorkshire (edited by Poole), Hull, 1855
Diocesan History of Peterborough, London

Notes

Attribution

1809 births
1883 deaths
19th-century English Anglican priests
English architecture writers
Alumni of Emmanuel College, Cambridge
People from Welford, Northamptonshire